Dargaville Aerodrome  is a small airport located 1 Nautical Mile (1.9 km) southeast of Dargaville township in Northland, New Zealand.

The airfield has an active aero club that provides training in advanced microlights, and has a regular 'fly-in' lunch every Saturday which attracts aviators from New Zealand's North island.

It is a base for topdressing aircraft working the surrounding area, and has Avgas available with a "Z" swipecard.

Dargaville airfield is at sea level at the northern end of the large Kaipara harbour, forming a pair with the similar sea level West Auckland Airport, at Parakai at the southern end of the harbour some 50 miles away.

Contact Info
Phone	(09) 439-8024 or 0274 784 308
Website	http://dargavilleac.weebly.com/

Operational Information 
Airfield Elevation: 6 ft AMSL
Runway 04/22 – 1000 x 12 meters rolled limestone
Runway 04/22 – 931 x 11 metres grass
Runway Strength – 02/20: ESWL 2500
No runway lighting available
Circuit:
Runways 04 – Right Hand
Runways 22 – Left Hand

Sources 
NZAIP Volume 4 AD
New Zealand AIP (PDF)
Dargaville Aero Club web site 
Z web site 

Kaipara District
Airports in New Zealand
Transport in the Northland Region
Dargaville
Transport buildings and structures in the Northland Region